Paddy O'Carroll may refer to:

 Paddy O'Carroll (swimmer), New Zealand swimmer
 Paddy O'Carroll (hurler), Irish hurler